Parliament House in Harare was an active legislative building for 112 years, acting as the base of Parliament of Rhodesia and the Parliament of Zimbabwe.

History 

The building was constructed in 1895.

The former hotel for white settlers was converted into a parliament in 1898 and expanded several times from 1937 onwards.

The building only had a capacity of 100 legislators, and so was replaced by the New Zimbabwe Parliament Building opening in 2022.

References 

Former seats of national legislatures
Legislative buildings
Government buildings in Zimbabwe
Buildings and structures in Harare
19th-century architecture
Government buildings completed in 1895
1895 establishments in Africa